Christophe Pras (8 March 1984 – 7 April 2020) was a French rugby union player and coach.

Biography 

Christophe Pras started playing rugby union at CS Vienne. He played at CS Bourgoin-Jallieu, at SO Chambéry, at SO Voiron and then at Bièvre Saint-Geoirs Rugby Club (Bièvre Saint-Geoirs RC).

He was selected for the French under-18 rugby union team.

He trained the Bièvre Saint-Geoirs RC, the Rugby Club du Pays Saint-Jeannais (RC Pays Saint-Jeannais) and later the FC Grenoble, of which he was a trainer in the youth teams (minimal).

Private life 

He was married to Cathy and had two children, Lise and Baptiste.

Pras died in Bourgoin-Jallieu on 7 April 2020, aged 36, from COVID-19, during the pandemic in France.

References

External links 

 Christophe Pras

French rugby union players
French rugby union coaches
1984 births
2020 deaths
Deaths from the COVID-19 pandemic in France
Sportspeople from Rhône (department)